The Tahiti national badminton team represents French Polynesia, an overseas collectivity of France, in international badminton team competitions. The Tahitian team has competed in the Oceania Badminton Championships since 2014. The men's team achieved third place three times in the team tournament while the mixed team won bronze in the 2014 Oceania Badminton Championships.

In 2021, the Tahitian men's and women's team would make their debuts onto the Thomas Cup and Uber Cup when they qualified for the 2020 Thomas & Uber Cup finals after the withdrawal of the Australian team and New Zealand declining the invitation. The team were also invited to compete in the 2021 Sudirman Cup.  The team was eliminated in the group stages.

Tahiti also competes in the Pacific Mini Games. The Tahitian team became the first nation to win the first ever badminton gold in the Pacific Mini Games.

Participation in BWF competitions

Thomas Cup

Uber Cup

Sudirman Cup

Participation in Oceania Badminton Championships

Men's team
{| class="wikitable"
|-
! Year !! Result
|-
| 2012 || Fourth place
|-
| 2016 ||  Third place
|-
| 2018 ||  Third place
|-
| 2020 ||  Third place
|}Women's teamParticipation in Pacific Mini GamesMixed team'''

Current squad 
The following players were selected to represent Tahiti at the 2020 Thomas & Uber Cup.

Male players
Louis Beaubois
Léo Cucuel
Glen Lefoll
Elias Maublanc
Rémi Rossi
Heiva Yvonet

Female players
Heirautea Curet
Maeva Gaillard
Jenica Lesourd
Mélissa Mi You
Chloé Segrestan

References

Badminton
National badminton teams
Badminton in French Polynesia